The National Chiang Kai-shek Memorial Hall is a national monument, landmark and tourist attraction erected in memory of Generalissimo Chiang Kai-shek, former President of the Republic of China. It is located in Taipei.

The monument, surrounded by a park, stands at the east end of Memorial Hall Square. It is flanked on the north and south by the National Theater and National Concert Hall.

Description
The Memorial Hall is white with four sides. The roof is blue and octagonal, a shape that picks up the symbolism of the number eight, a number traditionally associated in China with abundance and good fortune. Two sets of white stairs, each with 89 steps to represent Chiang's age at the time of his death, lead to the main entrance. The ground level of the memorial houses a library and a museum documenting Chiang Kai-shek's life and career, with exhibits detailing Taiwan's history and development. The upper level contains the main hall, in which a large statue of Chiang Kai-shek is located, and where a guard mounting ceremony takes place at regular intervals.

Development

After President Chiang Kai-shek died on 5 April 1975, the Executive branch of the government established a Funeral Committee to build a memorial. The design, by architect Yang Cho-cheng, was chosen in a competition. Yang's design incorporated many elements of traditional Chinese architecture to mirror that of the Sun Yat-sen Mausoleum in Nanjing in mainland China. (The Kuomintang (KMT) revered Dr. Sun as founder of the party and the government Chiang had led.) Groundbreaking for the memorial took place on 31 October 1976, the 90th anniversary of Chiang's birth. The hall officially opened on 5 April 1980, the fifth anniversary of the leader's death.

A main gate, the Gate of Great Centrality and Perfect Uprightness was placed at the west end on Chung Shan South Road, with a Gate of Great Loyalty standing at the north side on Hsin Yi (Xinyi) Road and a Gate of Great Piety standing at the south side on Ai Kuo (Aiguo) East Road. A Boulevard of Homage, bordered by manicured bushes, connected the main hall with the square.

Subsequent history
The square became Taipei's site of choice for mass gatherings as soon as it opened. The nature of many of those gatherings gave the site new public meanings. The hall and square became the hub of events in the 1980s and early 1990s that ushered Taiwan into its era of modern democracy. Of the many pro-democracy demonstrations that took place at the square, the most influential were the Wild Lily student movement rallies of 1990. The movement provided the impetus for the far-reaching political reforms of President Lee Teng-hui. These culminated in the first popular elections of national leaders in 1996.

The site's importance in the development of Taiwan's democracy led to the plaza's rededication as Liberty Square by President Chen Shui-bian in 2007. Memorial Hall was also renamed in a dedication to democracy. The announcement of the new names were greeted with hostility by Kuomintang officials. The original dedication to Chiang was subsequently restored to the hall by President Ma Ying-jeou, while the name Liberty Square was eventually affirmed by officials across party lines.

In 2017, on the occasion of the 70th anniversary of the February 28 Incident and the 30th anniversary of the lifting of martial law, Taiwan's Ministry of Culture announced plans to transform the hall into a national center for “facing history, recognizing agony, and respecting human rights.” Scholars and experts were invited to form an advisory group to help plan the hall's transformation. Public discussion of the transformation began the following year in forums held throughout Taiwan. 

The Chinese inscription now over the main gate declares the plaza Liberty Square. The calligraphic style recalls that of Wang Xizhi in the East Jin Dynasty (see Chinese calligraphy). The style is noted for its sense of vitality, movement and freedom. The characters in the inscription are placed in left-to-right sequence to follow modern practice in Taiwan. (The right-to-left order of ancient Chinese tradition had been observed at the site up until then.) See: 

In 2018, pro-independence student activists stormed the hall and threw paint on the statue of Chiang Kai-Shek, two were arrested and penalized for NT$2000.

In 2019 the Chiang Kai-shek Memorial Hall hosted an exhibition by the Chinese artist Ling Feng (靈峰). The 88 works exhibited were sharply critical of the Chinese Communist Party and authoritarianism in general.

Gallery

See also
 Chiang Kai-shek
 Cihu Presidential Burial Place
 National Theater and Concert Hall
 Sun Yat-sen Memorial Hall
 Sun Yat-sen Mausoleum
 Liberty Square (Taipei)
 Presidential Office Building
 Ching-kuo Memorial Hall in Matsu National Scenic Area
  (辭修公園; Former Tomb and Memorial Museum of Chen Cheng, demolished in 1995)
 Wild Lily student movement
 List of museums in Taiwan

References

External links

National Chiang Kai-shek Memorial Hall official website
National Theater and Concert Hall official website
Taiwan Ministry of Culture official website
Australian information page: Chiang Kai-shek Memorial

1980 establishments in Taiwan
Buildings and structures completed in 1980
Buildings and structures in Taipei
Chiang Kai-shek
Monuments and memorials in Taiwan
Tourist attractions in Taipei
National monuments of Taiwan